Amarnath is a 1978 Indian Kannada film, directed by K. Mani Murugan and produced by N. K. Narayan, V. K. Ramesh and P. B. Walke. The film stars Ambareesh, Sundar Krishna Urs, Dheerendra Gopal and K. S. Ashwath in lead roles. The film had musical score by Vijaya Bhaskar.

Cast

Ambareesh
Sundar Krishna Urs
Dheerendra Gopal
Vishnuvardhan in Guest Appearance
K. S. Ashwath
Musuri Krishnamurthy
Chethan
Ramanna Rai
Surendra
Venkataswamy
Javarayya
Tometo Somu
Somashekar
Kannada Raju
Leelavathi
Praveena
Sreekala (Rathidevi)
Subhadra
Suchithra
Prabhavathi
Premakumari
Gayathri

Soundtrack 
Hanave Ella baala tumba

Release

References

External links
 
 

1978 films
1970s Kannada-language films
Films scored by Vijaya Bhaskar